Ingrid Matthews is a violinist and was the Music Director of the Seattle Baroque Orchestra.

Ingrid Matthews is recognized as one of the leading baroque violinists and period instrument performers. In 1989 she was awarded first prize in the Erwin Bodky International Competition for Early Music, and she has performed  extensively with leading period-instrument ensembles such as Tafelmusik Baroque Orchestra, Philharmonia Baroque Orchestra and many others.  Matthews has served as concertmaster for the New York Collegium, under the direction of Andrew Parrott, and for the Boston Early Music Festival Orchestra, and as a guest director/soloist with numerous groups across North America. She studied with Josef Gingold and Stanley Ritchie at the Indiana University Jacobs School of Music.

Matthews founded Seattle Baroque Orchestra with harpsichordist Byron Schenkman in 1994 and was the Music Director from 1994 to 2013.

Matthews recorded many works from the baroque period, (including the Sonatas and Partitas for solo violin by Johann Sebastian Bach).

Sources 

American violinists
Baroque-violin players
Living people
Cornish College of the Arts faculty
Year of birth missing (living people)
Place of birth missing (living people)
Musicians from Seattle
American performers of early music
Women performers of early music
Founders of early music ensembles
Baroque musicians
Bach musicians
21st-century conductors (music)
21st-century violinists
Centaur Records artists